The 333rd Infantry Division was a division of the German Army during World War II. It was formed in November 1941, as a static division from cadres supplied by the 76th Infantry Division and the 293rd Infantry Division.

Location
1940 Belgium
1941-1943 France
1943 Eastern Front
October 1943 Destroyed near Zaporizhzhia in Ukraine and dissolved in November 1943

Commanders
Major General Rudolf Pitz (15 November 1940 - 10 December 1942) 
Major General Gerhard Grassman (10 December 1942 - 22 March 1943)
Major General Rudolf von Tschudi (22 March - 1 July 1943)
Colonel Wilhelm Crisolli (1–10 July 1943) 
Major General Erwin Menny (10 July - 17 October 1943)

Formation
679th Infantry Regiment
680th Infantry Regiment
681st Infantry Regiment
33rd Artillery Regiment
333rd Motorcycle Company
333rd Tank Destroyer Battalion
333rd Engineer Battalion
333rd Signal Company
333rd Divisional Supply Troops

References
Mitcham, Samual German Order of Battle: 291st-999th Infantry divisions page 39–40.

Military units and formations established in 1941
Infantry divisions of Germany during World War II
Military units and formations disestablished in 1944